Ebrahimabad-e Jadid (also Romanized as Ebrāhīmābād-e Jadīd) is a village in Qeshlaq-e Shomali Rural District, in the Central District of Parsabad County, Ardabil Province, Iran. At the 2006 census, its population was 2,006, in 432 families.

References 

Tageo

Towns and villages in Parsabad County